Ben C. Sheldon is the Luc Hoffmann Chair in Field Ornithology and Director of the Edward Grey Institute of Field Ornithology of the University of Oxford's Department of Zoology. He was Head of the Department of Zoology between 2016-2021.

His research addresses causes and consequences of individual variation in wild populations, particularly of birds.

He was awarded the 2020 Linnean Medal for "his service to science in the field of Zoology", and elected as Fellow of the Royal Society in 2022.

Education and Career 
Sheldon obtained his BA in Natural Sciences (Part II Zoology) at University of Cambridge, where lectures from Prof Nick Davies in Behavioural Ecology were particularly influential, and his PhD in Zoology from the University of Sheffield, under the supervision of Prof Tim Birkhead. He held a series of postdoctoral fellowships at the University of Uppsala and University of Edinburgh, before moving to the University of Oxford to hold a Royal Society University Research Fellowship in 2000.

Sheldon was appointed Head of the Edward Grey Institute in 2002, following the retirement of Prof Chris Perrins and elected as the first holder of the Luc Hoffmann Chair in Field Ornithology in 2004. He was Associate Head of Department from 2011-2016, and Head of Department from 2016-2021.

Awards and honours 
 1997 Association for the Study of Animal Behaviour Outstanding New Researcher Award 
2000 Royal Society University Research Fellow
2004 Scientific Medal of the Zoological Society of London 
2013 Royal Society Wolfson Merit Award
2018 Distinguished Naturalist Award  of the American Society of Naturalists
 2020 Linnean Medal
2020 Elected to the Academia Europaea
2022 Fellow of the Royal Society

Select publications

References 

Living people
British zoologists
Academics of the University of Oxford
Edward Grey Institute people
Year of birth missing (living people)
Linnean Medallists
Fellows of the Royal Society